Saturn Strip is an album by Alan Vega, released in 1983 on Elektra Records. The album was produced by Ric Ocasek and features musical contributions from Al Jourgensen.

"Kid Congo" is a homage to Kid Congo Powers, evolving from a soundcheck abstraction called "Bongo Bongo."

The album was reissued on CD in 2004 by Wounded Bird, which also included the Just a Million Dreams album.

Track listing
All tracks composed by Alan Vega; except where indicated
"Saturn Drive" (Al Jourgensen, Alan Vega) - 5:36
"Video Babe" - 3:17
"American Dreamer" (Ric Ocasek, Vega) - 5:04
"Kid Congo" - 2:37
"Goodbye Darling" (Mark Kuch, Vega) - 2:38
"Wipeout Beat" - 5:59
"Je T'Adore" - 3:40
"Angel" - 5:06
"Every 1's a Winner" (Errol Brown) - 4:10

Personnel
Alan Vega - vocals
Mark Kuch - guitar
Larry Chaplin - bass
Sesu Coleman  - drums
Stephen George - drums on "Saturn Drive", "American Dreamer" and "Wipeout Beat"
Ric Ocasek - guitar, keyboards
Al Jourgensen - keyboards on "Saturn Drive"
Greg Hawkes - synthesizer, saxophone on "Wipeout Beat"
Technical
Michael Zilkha - executive producer

References

Alan Vega albums
1983 albums
Albums produced by Ric Ocasek
Elektra Records albums